Duncan MacLaren Young Sommerville  (1879–1934) was a Scottish mathematician and astronomer. He compiled a bibliography on non-Euclidean geometry and also wrote a leading textbook in that field. He also wrote Introduction to the Geometry of N Dimensions, advancing the study of polytopes. He was a co-founder and the first secretary of the New Zealand Astronomical Society.

Sommerville was also an accomplished watercolourist, producing a series New Zealand landscapes.

The middle name 'MacLaren' is spelt using the old orthography M'Laren in some sources, for example the records of the Royal Society of Edinburgh.

Early life
Sommerville was born on 24 November 1879 in Beawar in India, where his father the Rev Dr James Sommerville, was employed as a missionary by the United Presbyterian Church of Scotland. His father had been responsible for establishing the hospital at Jodhpur, Rajputana.

The family returned home to Perth, Scotland, where Duncan spent 4 years at a private school, before completing his education at Perth Academy. His father died in his youth. He lived with his mother at 12 Rose Terrace. Despite his father's death, he won a scholarship, allowing him to continue his studies to university level.

He then studied mathematics at the University of St Andrews in Fife, graduating MA in 1902. He then began as an assistant lecturer at the university. In 1905 he gained his doctorate (DSc) for his thesis, Networks of the Plane in Absolute Geometry and was promoted to lecturer. He continued teaching mathematics at St Andrews until 1915.

In projective geometry the method of Cayley–Klein metrics had been used in the 19th century to model non-euclidean geometry. In 1910 Duncan wrote "Classification of geometries with projective metrics". The classification is described by Daniel Corey as follows:
He classifies them into 9 types of plane geometries, 27 in dimension 3, and more generally 3n in dimension n. A number of these geometries have found applications, for instance in physics.

In 1910 Sommerville reported to the British Association on the need for a bibliography on non-euclidean geometry, noting that the field had no International Association like the Quaternion Society to sponsor it.

In 1911 Sommerville published his compiled bibliography of works on non-euclidean geometry, and it received favorable reviews. In 1970 Chelsea Publishing issued a second edition which referred to collected works then available of some of the cited authors.

Sommerville was elected a Fellow of the Royal Society of Edinburgh in 1911. His proposers were Peter Redford Scott Lang, Robert Alexander Robertson, William Peddie and George Chrystal.

Family

In 1912 he married Louisa Agnes Beveridge.

Work in New Zealand
In 1915 Sommerville went to New Zealand to take up the Chair of Pure and Applied Mathematics at the Victoria College of Wellington.

Duncan became interested in honeycombs and wrote "Division of space by congruent triangles and tetrahedra" in 1923. The following year he extended results to n-dimensional space.

He also discovered the Dehn–Sommerville equations for the number of faces of convex polytopes.

Sommerville used geometry to describe the voting theory of a preferential ballot. He addressed Nanson's method where n candidates are ordered by voters into a sequence of preferences. Sommerville shows that the outcomes lie in n ! simplexes that cover the surface of an n − 2 dimensional spherical space.

When his Introduction to Geometry of N Dimensions appeared in 1929, it received a positive review from B. C. Wong in the American Mathematical Monthly.

Sommerville was co-founder and first secretary of the New Zealand Astronomical Society (1920). He was President of Section A of the Australasian Association for the Advancement of Science meeting, Adelaide (1924). In 1926 he became a fellow of the Royal Astronomical Society.

He died in New Zealand on 31 January 1934.

Textbooks

 1914: The Elements of Non-Euclidean Geometry. G. Bell & Sons.
 1929: An Introduction to the Geometry of N Dimensions, Methuen & Co. (Dover Publications edition, 1958)
 1933: Analytical Conics. G. Bell and Sons.
 1934: Analytical Geometry of Three Dimensions. Cambridge University Press.

References

Citations

Sources 

 H.W. Turnbull (1934) "Duncan M. Y. Sommerville", Journal of the London Mathematical Society 9(4):316–18.
 B. A. Rosenfeld (1979) "The Works on Geometry of Duncan Sommerville", Istoriko-Matematicheskie Issledovania, .

External links

Obituary, Monthly Notices of the Royal Astronomical Society Vol. 95, pp. 330–331.
C.J. Seelye (1974) Mathematics At Victoria In Retrospect, Notes for a talk to the Mathematics and Physics Society, from NZETC.

1879 births
1934 deaths
People from Perth, Scotland
People from Wellington City
People educated at Perth Academy
Alumni of the University of St Andrews
Fellows of the Royal Society of Edinburgh
Geometers
20th-century New Zealand astronomers
20th-century New Zealand historians
20th-century Scottish historians
20th-century New Zealand mathematicians
20th-century Scottish mathematicians
20th-century New Zealand painters
20th-century New Zealand male artists
Scottish watercolourists
Academic staff of the Victoria University of Wellington
Scottish emigrants to New Zealand
British historians of mathematics
Fellows of the Royal Astronomical Society
Academics of the University of St Andrews
20th-century Scottish painters
Scottish male painters
20th-century Scottish male artists